Chrissy's Court is an American comedic arbitration-based court show starring television personality and model Chrissy Teigen and her mother, Vilailuck "Pepper Thai" Teigen. The series premiered on April 6, 2020, on Quibi.

In June 2020, Quibi renewed the series for a second season. Despite Quibi's shutdown, the library was moved to Roku, and Chrissy's Court was added in May 2021. Season 2 premiered on June 17, 2022. The third season premiered on October 21, 2022.

Premise
Chrissy's Court shows "Chrissy Teigen reigns supreme as the 'judge' over one small claims case. The plaintiffs, defendants, and disputes are real, as Chrissy's mom turned 'bailiff', Pepper Thai, maintains order in the courtroom."

Production
On May 23, 2019, it was announced that Quibi had ordered 10 episodes of the courtroom comedy series starring Chrissy Teigen and her mother, Vilailuck "Pepper Thai" Teigen.

The series is executive produced by Teigen through Suit & Thai Productions, and Luke Dillon through 3 Arts Entertainment.

Viewership 
The second season's premiere on The Roku Channel was touted as the most watched unscripted Roku Original premiere ever.

Episodes

Release
On March 2, 2020, it was announced that the series would be released on April 6, 2020 on Quibi.

References

External links
Chrissy's Court on The Roku Channel
 

2020s American comedy television series
2020s American legal television series
2020 American television series debuts
English-language television shows
Court shows
Quibi original programming
Television series by 3 Arts Entertainment